Huaxi Subdistrict is a subdistrict in Banan District, Chongqing, China. , it has 18 residential communities and 6 villages under its administration.

See also 
 List of township-level divisions of Chongqing

References 

Township-level divisions of Chongqing